Samuel James Ward (21 March 1880 – 1968) was an English footballer who played in the Football League for Wolverhampton Wanderers.

References

1880 births
1968 deaths
English footballers
Association football defenders
English Football League players
Wolverhampton Wanderers F.C. players
Wednesbury Old Athletic F.C. players
Dudley Town F.C. players
Brierley Hill Alliance F.C. players
Worcester City F.C. players